Cysteine methyl ester is the organic compound with the formula HSCH2CH(NH2)CO2CH3.  A white solid, it is the methyl ester of the amino acid cysteine.

Uses
Under the brand name Mecysteine, cysteine methyl ester is a commercial drug with mucolytic activity. It is used as mucolytic and fluidifying for chronic and acute respiratory disorders. The drug is sold under the commercial names Delta in Paraguay, and Pectite and Zeotin in Japan.

Cysteine methyl ester is also used as a building block for synthesis of N,S-heterocycles.

References 

Expectorants
Amino acid derivatives
Methyl esters
Thiols
Sulfur amino acids